Marcel Cabiddu (10 February 195213 January 2004) was a French politician.

Political career
Cabiddu was voted as member of parliament during the 2002 French legislative election in the 11th district of Pas-de-Calais. He was a member of the Socialist Party. Struggling with diabetes which affected him heavily, he took his own life in January 2004. He was replaced on 20 January 2004 by Odette Duriez.

Positions
20 March 1977 to 12 March 1983 - deputy mayor of Wingles, Pas-de-Calais
21 March 1982 to 1 October 1988 - member of the departmental council of Pas-de-Calais
14 March 1983 to 12 March 1989 - mayor of Wingles
2 October 1988 to 27 March 1994 - member of the departmental council of Pas-de-Calais
20 March 1989 to 18 June 1995 - mayor of Wingles
27 March 1994 to 18 March 2001 - member of the departmental council of Pas-de-Calais
27 March 1994 to 26 March 1998 - vice-president of the departmental council of Pas-de-Calais
25 June 1995 to 18 March 2001 - mayor of Wingles
1 June 1997 to 18 June 2002 - deputy of Pas-de-Calais
27 March 1998 to 18 March 2001 - vice-president of the departmental council of Pas-de-Calais
18 March 2001 to 13 January 2004 - mayor of Wingles (replaced by Gérard Dassonvalle, his deputy)
18 June 2002 to 13 January 2004 - deputy of Pas-de-Calais

Legacy
A park in the east of Wingles is named after Cabiddu.

References

Note - Much of the content in this article is transferred from the corresponding article in French.

2004 deaths
1952 births
Socialist Party (France) politicians
Mayors of places in Hauts-de-France
Deputies of the 11th National Assembly of the French Fifth Republic
Deputies of the 12th National Assembly of the French Fifth Republic
People from Pas-de-Calais
French politicians who committed suicide